The Nashwaak River, located in west-central New Brunswick, Canada, is a tributary of the Saint John River. It is 113 kilometres long. The river rises from Nashwaak Lake (southeast of the village of Juniper) and flows south and east through uninhabited land and rapids to the village of Stanley. From Stanley, the Nashwaak flows southeast to Nashwaak Bridge and Taymouth, then south the  through several rural communities such as Durham Bridge, the historic town of  Nashwaak Village and Penniac before it reaches the town of Marysville. It flows into the Saint John River opposite downtown Fredericton.

The river's name comes from the Maliseet language, a corruption of the word for slow current. It was used heavily by the Maliseet people as a transportation route to northwestern New Brunswick. A French fort, Fort Nashwaak, was built at the river's mouth in 1692 (near present day Barker's Point, New Brunswick) and was the first European settlement in the Fredericton area. It was captured by the British in 1696, and land along the river was later granted to United Empire Loyalists during the American Revolution. Further settlement occurred through the 19th century. A rail line and Route 8, both important links from southern to northern New Brunswick, were built along the river's shore. The rails were removed in 1995 and it is now a walking trail.

Today, the river is popular for canoeing and salmon fishing, and tubing.

Ecological issues

Salmon 

Aquaculture practices from upstream in the Saint John river have caused a dramatic drop in the salmon population of the Nashwaak river. In the past, the river was known for its abundance of salmon but in recent years this number has decreased due to farming in various locations along the Saint John and in the Bay of Fundy. Fish raised in these hatcheries do not tend to migrate along their natural predecessors' routes up the Nashwaak as they once did due to the removal of a biological memory system developed over the ages to ensure their survival and propagation. Modern dams and netting practices prevent the fish from returning to previously established spawning routes. Over time this practice has altered the memory of the species and therefore diminished the number previously documented in the Naswaak river system.

This process has been documented as being problematic in other locations around the world; as Ellen Wohl points out, "Similar attempts either to provide fish passage around a dam or to breed fish in a hatchery have been disimal failures for salmon and other species in the United States."

References

See also
List of bodies of water of New Brunswick

Rivers of New Brunswick
Tributaries of the Saint John River (Bay of Fundy)